Hujjat al-Islam Sayyid Dr. Moustafa al-Musawi al-Qazwini (born 1961) is an Iraqi-American Shia Imam.   He is the Imam at the Islamic Educational Center of Orange County in Orange Country, California. He is also on the board of directors of the Development and Relief Foundation in Iraq.

Biography

Early life and education 
al-Qazwini was born in Karbala in 1961. His father is Murtadha al-Qazwini from the al-Qazwini family, and his mother is the daughter of Abd al-Amir Nasrallah, from the Nasrallah family. His family was exiled from Iraq whilst he was still young, and upon settling in Qom, in 1980, he joined the seminary and began his religious education.

In 1987, he travelled to Damascus to serve as a teacher at the Islamic seminary. He then travelled to London in 1989, and contributed as associate Imam and professor of Islamic Studies at several Islamic centers and foundations.

Settling in the United States 
In 1994, al-Qazwini travelled to the United States, where his father and brothers were. He founded the Islamic Cultural Center of San Diego, California.  This center was the first Shia mosque established in San Diego County for religious and social events.

In September 1996, he founded the Islamic Educational Center of Orange County (IECOC), drawing on his experience in Islamic Studies.

al-Qazwini's past associations have included:

 Chairman of the Development and World Events Committee of the Islamic Shura Council of Southern California (an umbrella organization for sixty-four mosques and Islamic centers), a board member of the council of Shia Muslim scholars of North America.
 Co-chair of the West Coast Dialogue of Muslims and Catholics
 Adviser for the United Muslim American Association.

He spends much of his time lecturing across the world and nationally at churches, universities and on panels with other parishioners.

Controversy 
On 23 June 2017 in a sermon delivered in Orange County, California, al-Qazwini declared that ISIS was supported by Israeli intelligence, shortly after a Wall Street Journal investigative article detailed secret Israeli aid to various Syrian rebel groups, which was confirmed by Israeli authorities, including as far back as 2014. Shortly thereafter, describing unreliable information he had received from Iraqi political and military sources, he publicly retracted the statement and apologized for hurting the sentiments of his Jewish friends and the Jewish community.

Personal life 
 al-Qazwini is married to the daughter of Fadhil al-Milani. He has two sons; Mahdi and Hadi.

Bibliography 
 Discovering Islam
 Inquiries About Shi'a Islam
 When Power and Piety Collide

References 

1961 births
Living people
American Shia Muslims
American imams
Iraqi emigrants to the United States
Iraqi Shia Muslims
People from Karbala
Religious leaders from California
Ahlulbayt TV people
Iraqi people of Iranian descent